Jyderup is an old town with a population of 4,325 in Holbæk Municipality (1 January 2022) in northwestern Zealand, Denmark. It is positioned roughly halfway between the larger cities of Kalundborg and Holbæk on the west and east, respectively, and is surrounded by forest and farmland. The town is bordered on the west by the lake of Skarresø.

Jyderup is split in two parts divided by the road between Holbæk and Kalundborg named Skovvejen (English: Forest Road). 

The northeastern part is the oldest, containing the 13th-century church. The southwestern part was built when the railroad was constructed in the early 1900s, and contains most of the shops and stores in the town. In early 2008, the town library was also moved to this part, when the townhall building stood empty, after Tornved Municipality became part of Holbæk Municipality in 2007, and the local authority was moved out of the town for the sake of centralization.

Notable people 
 Malena Belafonte, former international fashion model turned singer, performer, producer, entrepreneur and creative director
 Kamilla Larsen (born 1983 in Jyderup), Danish team handball player

References

External links
Official website of Jyderup Erhvervsforening (English: Jyderup Business Association) (in Danish)

Cities and towns in Region Zealand
Holbæk Municipality